War of the Worlds (2019) was a four city, four event professional wrestling tour co-produced by the American Ring of Honor (ROH) and Japanese New Japan Pro-Wrestling (NJPW) promotions.

The cards took place on May 8, 2019 at Buffalo RiverWorks in Buffalo, New York, May 9 at the Ted Reeve Arena in Toronto, Ontario, May 11 at the DeltaPlex Arena in Grand Rapids, Michigan and May 12 at the Odeum Expo Center in Villa Park, Illinois. The first three nights aired live on Honor Club and Fite.tv, while the fourth night was taped for four future episodes, including the 400th overall episode, of ROH's weekly television program, Ring of Honor Wrestling.

Storylines

During a tag team match between The Kingdom and Villain Enterprises PCO and Brody King, PCO pinned current ROH World Champion Matt Taven. The following week on the Ring of Honor television taping, it was announced that Matt Taven would defend his title against PCO, which was made official.

At G1 Supercard, the Guerillas of Destiny won a winner takes all match for both the ROH Tag Team Championship and the IWGP Tag Team Championship on the line. At Masters of the Craft, Jay Lethal and Jonathan Gresham won a 30-minute Iron Man Match against Lifeblood Mark Haskins and Tracy Williams 2-1 to earn an opportunity against the Guerillas of Destiny. A week later during the ROH television tapings, the match was made official.

Results

Night 1: Buffalo

Night 2: Toronto

Night 3: Grand Rapids

Night 4: Chicago (TV Tapings)

References

2019 in professional wrestling
Professional wrestling in Buffalo, New York
ROH/NJPW War of the Worlds
Ring of Honor shows
New Japan Pro-Wrestling shows
Events in Villa Park, Illinois
Events in Buffalo, New York
Events in Toronto